The Autovía A-47 is a proposed highway in Spain, it is planned as an upgrade of the N-433.

The road will commence in the mountains 35 km north of Sevilla  with a junction with the Autovía A-66 at Las Nieves.  It heads north west along the wooded valley of the Guadiamar before entering the Parque Nacional de la Sierra de Aracena y Picos de Aroche, which is part of the Sierra Morena, which form the northern side of the Guadalquivir river valley.

The road enters Aracena, which lies on the northern slopes of the Sierra de Aracena overlooking a Reservoir and Rivera de Huelva.  The town is the location of the Gruta de las Maravillas.  16 km further west the road crosses the N-435 between Huelva and Badajoz.  The road continues west past Cortegana before leaving the Parque at Aroche.  The road then enters the valley of the Riviera de Chanza before coming to the Portugal frontier at Rosal de la Frontera which lies below the Serra da Adica.  The road continues into Portugal as the IP-8 / N-260 to Beja.

A-47
A-47